Michael Duffy may refer to:

Michael Duffy (Australian journalist), Australian crime novelist
Michael Duffy (Australian politician) (born 1938), Australian politician
Michael Duffy (Irish politician) (fl. 1922–1936), Irish politician and trade unionist
Michael Duffy (historian), British historian
Mike Duffy (born 1946), Canadian journalist and senator
Michael Duffy (American journalist), American journalist and assistant managing editor for Time magazine
Michael Duffy (footballer) (born 1994), Northern Irish footballer
Michael Duffy (Queensland politician) (1850–1926), member of the Queensland Legislative Assembly
Michael Duffy (equestrian), Irish showjumper